The Hong Kong Champion Griffin is an honour given in Hong Kong Thoroughbred horse racing. It is awarded annually by the Hong Kong Jockey Club (HKJC). A Griffin is a horse of two or three years of age which has been imported to Hong Kong without previously racing.

The honour is part of the Hong Kong Jockey Club Champion Awards and is awarded at the end of the Hong Kong season in July.

Winners

References

Horse racing awards
Horse racing in Hong Kong